Boutillier is a French surname. Notable people with the surname include:

 Arthur Moren Boutillier (1869–1955), Canadian politician
 Rémi Boutillier (born 1990), French tennis player
 Thomas Boutillier (1797–1861), Canadian doctor and politician

See also
 Boutilier, surname
 Le Boutillier, surname

French-language surnames